Consort Cao may refer to:

Cao Jie (empress) (died 260), wife of Emperor Xian of Han
Consort Dowager Cao (died 562), concubine of Xiao Cha (Emperor Xuan of Western Liang)
Empress Cao (Dou Jiande's wife) ( 621)
Empress Cao (Huang Chao's wife) (died 884)
Empress Dowager Cao (Li Cunxu's mother) (died 925), concubine of Li Keyong
Empress Cao (Li Siyuan's wife) (died 937), empress of Later Tang
Empress Cao (Song dynasty) (1016–1079), wife of Emperor Renzong of Song
Consort Duan (died 1542), concubine of the Jiajing Emperor